Tennis events were contested at the 1997 Summer Universiade in the island of Sicily, Italy.

Medal summary

Medal table

See also
 Tennis at the Summer Universiade

External links
Tennis at the 1997 Universiade

1997
Universiade
1997 Summer Universiade